The term Paceman is used in reference to:
Mini Paceman automobiles
Practitioners of fast bowling in the game of cricket
Bowling machines that fire cricket balls
The image evaluation process in radiography
Pace-setters in running

See also
Pacemaker (disambiguation)
Pac-Man
Pac-Man (disambiguation)